Eduard Aleksandrovich Koksharov (born 4 November 1975) is a Russian handball player and coach of the HC Meshkov Brest.

He played as a left winger. He retired from his national team in 2012. He came to Celje from SKIF Krasnodar in the 1999–2000 season, at the age of 23. His biggest achievements include winning the gold medal at the 1997 World Championships and winning the handball tournament at the 2000 Summer Olympics in Sydney, both with Russia. He was also the winner of the Champions League with Celje Pivovarna Laško in the 2003/04 season.

Honors
 Olympic Games
 1 Gold medal (2000 Summer Olympics)
 1 Bronze medal (2004 Summer Olympics)
 European Championships
 1 Silver medal (2000 European Championship)
 World Championships
 1 Gold medal (1997 World Championship)
 1 Silver medal (1999 World Championship)
 World Junior Championships
 1 Gold medal (1995 World Junior Championship)
 All star team: 
  World Championships: 2001, 2003, 2005, 2007
  European Championships: 2004, 2006
 Slovenian champion: 2000, 2001, 2003, 2004, 2005, 2006, 2007, 2008
 Slovenian Cup winner: 2000, 2001, 2004, 2006, 2007.

Personal life
His son Aleksandr Koksharov is a professional football player.

See also
List of handballers with 1000 or more international goals

References

External links

1975 births
Living people
Russian male handball players
Olympic handball players of Russia
Olympic gold medalists for Russia
Olympic bronze medalists for Russia
Handball players at the 2000 Summer Olympics
Handball players at the 2004 Summer Olympics
Handball players at the 2008 Summer Olympics
Sportspeople from Krasnodar
Olympic medalists in handball
Medalists at the 2004 Summer Olympics
Medalists at the 2000 Summer Olympics
Handball coaches of international teams
Russian expatriate sportspeople in North Macedonia
Russian expatriate sportspeople in Slovenia